Afghan-India Friendship Dam (AIFD), formerly Salma Dam, is a hydroelectric and irrigation dam project located on the Hari River in Chishti Sharif District of Herat Province in western Afghanistan. Since this project is funded and constructed by the Government of India as a part of the Indian aid project, the Afghan cabinet renamed the Salma Dam to the Afghan-India Friendship Dam in a gesture of gratitude to strengthen relations between the two countries.

The dam was opened on 4 June 2016 by Indian Prime Minister Narendra Modi along with former Afghan President Ashraf Ghani.

History

Feasibility reports for the construction of a dam in Chesti-e-Sharif district were prepared in 1957. In 1976, an Afghan firm was tasked with construction of the dam. The firm appointed Water and Power Consultancy Services (India) Ltd (WAPCOS), a company owned by the Indian Ministry of Water Resources, to construct the dam. The 1979 Soviet invasion of Afghanistan halted work on the project.

WAPCOS Ltd attempted to continue construction on the dam in 1988, but the project was left incomplete again due to the ongoing instability. In 2006, India committed to funding the completion of the Salma Dam at an estimated cost of US$ 275 million. 

In January 2013, the Indian cabinet approved revised cost of ₹ 1,457 crores (US$ 273.3 million) for the completion of the project and declared it would be completed in December 2014, or two years behind the previous schedule. On 26 July 2015 the dam began to impound its reservoir.

The dam was inaugurated on 4 June 2016 by Indian Prime Minister Narendra Modi along with Afghan President Ashraf Ghani.

Indian Public sector power equipment manufacturer BHEL played an instrumental role in execution of this project by successfully commissioning two 14MW units in Salma Dam (renamed as Afghan-India Friendship Dam) project.

Incidents
Some Afghans believe that politicians in Iran were attempting to stop work on the dam project, which would reduce the flow of river water into neighbouring Iran. According to the local Afghan National Police of the area, the Iranian government is funding local Taliban members to oppose construction of the dam. In 2009, a parliamentarian from Kabul Province, Najibullah Kabuli accused Iran of interfering in the construction of the Salma Dam.

When the governor of Chishti Sharif District, Abdulqudus Qayam, was killed along with five security officials in mid-January 2010, the Afghan media called it an insurgent attack. The Taliban accepted responsibility, but many in Herat saw it as part of a wider problem the province is having with Iran. Qayam had been instrumental in pushing the construction of the dam.

According to NDS spokesman Shafiqullah Tahiri, "Mullah Abdul Ghani, a member of the Quetta Shura who plans suicide attacks, was behind the conspiracy". The explosives were discovered in a deserted area of the Pashtun Zarghun District of Herat Province, which were smuggled into the area from Balochistan, Pakistan. One person by the name of Sayed Gul was arrested.

In 2021, some Taliban forces seized control of the dam. Many US troops are leaving the country or have left, making it very difficult for Afghanistan forces to defend the country. According to Khaama Press, rockets and artillery were fired by the Taliban at the dam, although it did not hit the dam.

See also

List of dams and reservoirs in Afghanistan

References

External links
 The Amazing Indian Story Behind Herat’s Salma Dam - thewire.in

Dams in Afghanistan
Hydroelectric power stations in Afghanistan
Buildings and structures in Herat Province
Afghanistan–India relations
Dams completed in 2016
2016 establishments in Afghanistan
Dam controversies
Rock-filled dams